Mary E. Sawyer (1846–1902), better known as Mollie Monroe, was an American old west woman who was known for crossdressing and for her liaisons with multiple men.

Monroe fell in love with a man as a teenager. Both her family and her boyfriend's family agreed that the couple was too young to marry, and the man was sent away. Monroe then decided to go after her boyfriend, disguised as a man and calling herself Sam Brewer. Her search ended in sadness, when she discovered her boyfriend had been murdered by a gang during a bar brawl. Monroe then swore to avenge his death, crossing virtually every city from Utah to northern Mexico. She failed to find her boyfriend's killers, and became an alcoholic.

Around 1870, she met George Monroe, a well known and rich miner. Mollie and George Monroe married and settled in Wickenburg, Arizona, where they mined together. In 1874, they moved to Prescott, Arizona. George Monroe had discovered a water spring there. He turned it into a resort and named it "Monroe Springs". The attraction drew many tourists from around the country.

Mollie Monroe was also a gambler. Apart from her alcoholism, her gambling addiction also led her to lose a considerable amount of money, once selling a gold mine she had discovered for around $2,500 dollars, then gambling the money away in about a week.

Despite her addictions, Monroe enjoyed helping needy people, such as prostitutes, lone women and their children. Legend has it that once she met a woman and her children; having been told by the woman that her husband went to town for supplies three days before and had not returned, she went searching for the man, and found him in a bar. She then led him out of the bar, tied him to her horse and dragged him all the way back to his house, staying overnight to make sure he wouldn't leave the house again.

A newspaper report also told of her saving the lives of 20 army men when attacked by Apaches. According to the article, she had left the men to look for items to cook with, and when she returned, she noticed that the army men were surrounded by Apache, and that two army men had already been killed. She and her friend, Texas Johnson, fired shots into the air, and the Apaches ran, according to the news.

Mollie Monroe was despised by most of Prescott's high society women, for what they viewed as "manly manners" and, as a popular publication of the time said, "morals that are dissolute".

In 1877, she was found wandering across the streets of Peeples Valley by a policeman named Ed Bowers. Brought to trial, she was found to be insane on May 9 and sent to a sanitarium in Stockton, California.
Along the way to Stockton, she and Bowers were attacked by thieves. Other than Bowers losing a watch and some 450 dollars, the lawman and Monroe came out unscathed from the attack.
Mollie Monroe's times at the California asylum did not go without controversy: she tried burning the building once, causing her to be sent to San Quentin jail. Once there, she forged a friendship with former Arizona governor A.P.K. Safford (after whom the city of Safford, Arizona is named). Many viewed this as an attempt by Mollie to get out of San Quentin.

In 1887, she was sent to a new asylum built in Phoenix. In 1895, she escaped the asylum, and was found four days later. With only a few crackers and a bottle of water taken to support herself, she was found bleeding and in bad overall health.

Her health, troubled by her alcohol problems, continued to decline, and in 1902, she died in the Phoenix asylum.

References
 Leo Banks, Stalwart Women: Frontier Stories of Indomitable Spirit

1846 births
1902 deaths
People from Prescott, Arizona
Cross-dressers
Arizona pioneers
People from Wickenburg, Arizona